Gdańsk is a Polish parliamentary constituency in the Pomeranian Voivodeship.  It elects thirteen members of the Sejm.

The district has the number '25' for elections to the Sejm and is named after the city of Gdańsk.  It includes the counties of Gdańsk, Kwidzyn, Malbork, Nowy Dwór Gdański, Starogard, Sztum, and Tczew, and the city counties of Gdańsk and Sopot.

List of members

2019-2023

Footnotes

Electoral districts of Poland
Gdańsk
Pomeranian Voivodeship